Darjeeling District is the northernmost district of the state of West Bengal in eastern India in the foothills of the Himalayas. The district is famous for its hill station and Darjeeling tea. Darjeeling is the district headquarters.

Kurseong, Siliguri and Mirik, three  major towns in the district, are the subdivisional headquarters of the district. Kalimpong was one of the subdivisions but on 14 February 2017, it officially became a separate Kalimpong district.

Geographically, the district can be divided into two broad divisions: the hills and the plains. The entire hilly region of the district comes under the Gorkhaland Territorial Administration, a semi-autonomous administrative body under the state government of West Bengal. This body covers the three hill subdivisions of Darjeeling, Kurseong and Mirik and the district of Kalimpong. The foothills of Darjeeling Himalayas, which comes under the Siliguri subdivision, is known as the Terai. The district is bounded on the north by Sikkim, on the south by Kishanganj district of Bihar state, on the southeast by Panchagarh district of Bangladesh, on the east by Kalimpong and Jalpaiguri districts, and on the west by easternmost Province No. 1 of Nepal. As of 2011, it was the second least populous district of West Bengal (out of 19), after Dakshin Dinajpur.

Name
The etymological term of Darjeeling is denoted "Tajenglung", a Yakthung Limbu terminology that means the stones that "talk to each other", according to the historian Sankarhang Subba of Darjeeling. The name Darjeeling acclaimed from the Tibetan words Dorje, which is the thunderbolt sceptre of the Hindu deity Indra, and ling, which means "a place" or "land".

History
The ancient inhabitants of Darjeeling are the Lepcha and Limbu.

Most of Darjeeling formed a part of dominions of the Chogyal of Sikkim, who had been engaged in an unsuccessful warfare against the Gorkhas of Nepal. From 1780, the Gorkhas made several attempts to capture the entire region of Darjeeling. By the beginning of the 19th century, they had overrun Sikkim as far eastward as the Teesta River and had conquered and annexed the entire Terai.

In the meantime, the British were engaged in preventing the Gorkhas from over-running the whole of the northern frontier. The Anglo-Gorkha war broke out in 1814, which resulted in the defeat of the Gorkhas and subsequently led to the signing of the Sugauli Treaty in 1815. According to the treaty, Nepal had to cede all those territories which the Gorkhas had annexed from the Chogyal of Sikkim to the British East India Company (i.e., the area between Mechi River and Teesta River). In 1817, through the Treaty of Titalia, the British East India Company reinstated the Chogyal of Sikkim, restored all the tracts of land between the Mechi and the Teesta rivers to the Chogyal of Sikkim and guaranteed his sovereignty.

In November 1864, the Treaty of Sinchula was executed in which the Bhutan Dooars with the passes leading into the hills and Kalimpong were ceded to the British by Bhutan. The Darjeeling district can be said to have assumed its present shape and size in 1866 with an area of 1234 sq. miles.

Before 1861 and from 1870 to 1874, Darjeeling District was a "Non-Regulated Area" (where acts and regulations of the British Raj did not automatically apply in the district in line with rest of the country, unless specifically extended). From 1862 to 1870, it was considered a "Regulated Area". The phrase "Non-Regulated Area" was changed to "Scheduled District" in 1874 and again to "Backward Tracts" in 1919. The status was known as "Partially Excluded Area" from 1935 until the independence of India.

On 14 February 2017, Kalimpong district was carved out of Darjeeling district.

Gorkhaland Movement

During the 1980s, the Gorkha National Liberation Front led an intensive and often violent campaign for the creation of a separate Gorkhaland state within India, across the Nepali-speaking areas in northern West Bengal. The movement reached its peak around 1986–1988 but ended with the establishment of the Darjeeling Gorkha Hill Council in 1988.

The hill areas of Darjeeling enjoyed some measure of autonomy under the Darjeeling Gorkha Hill Council. However, the demand for full statehood within India has emerged once again, with the Gorkha Janmukti Morcha as its chief proponent. The Gorkhaland Territorial Administration replaced the DGHC in August 2012 after the GJM signed an agreement with the government.

Geography

The Darjeeling hill area is formed of comparatively recent rock structure that has a direct bearing on landslides. Heavy monsoon precipitation contributes to the landslides. Soils of Darjeeling hill areas are extremely varied, depending on elevation, degree of slope, vegetative cover and geolithology.

The Himalayas serve as the source of natural resources for the population residing in the hills as well as in the plains. As human population expands in the hills, forests are being depleted for the extension of agricultural lands, introduction of new settlements, roadways, etc. The growing changes coming in the wake of urbanisation and industrialisation leave deep impressions on the hill ecosystem.

The economy of Darjeeling hill area depends on tea production, horticulture, agriculture, forestry and tourism. About 30 percent of the forest covers found in the lower hills are deciduous. Evergreen forest constitutes only about 6 percent of the total forest coverage. Shorea robusta remains the most prominent species of tropical moist deciduous forest along with heavy undergrowth.

Teesta, Rangeet, Mechi, Balason, Mahananda and Rammam are the important rivers of the district.

Climate

Area

Subdivisions 
Darjeeling District comprises four subdivisions:

 Darjeeling Sadar subdivision
 Kurseong subdivision
 Mirik subdivision
 Siliguri subdivision

Assembly constituencies

The district was previously divided into six assembly constituencies. As per the order of the Delimitation Commission in respect of the delimitation of constituencies in West Bengal, the district had been divided into six assembly constituencies. Kalimpong has become a separate district from 14 February 2017, so the number of assembly constituencies in Darjeeling district is now five.

 Darjeeling (assembly constituency no. 23)
 Kurseong (assembly constituency no. 24)
 Matigara-Naxalbari (SC) (assembly constituency no. 25)
 Siliguri (assembly constituency no. 26)
 Phansidewa (ST) (assembly constituency no. 27)

Phansidewa constituency is reserved for Scheduled Tribes (ST) candidates. Matigara-Naxalbari constituency is reserved for Scheduled Castes (SC) candidates. Along with one assembly constituency from Kalimpong district and one assembly constituency from Uttar Dinajpur district, the five assembly constituencies of this district form the Darjeeling Lok Sabha constituency.

Demographics

According to the 2011 census Darjeeling district has a population of 1,846,823, roughly equal to the population of Kosovo. This gives it a ranking of 257th in India (out of a total of 640). Its population growth rate over the decade 2001-2011 was 14.77%. Darjeeling has a sex ratio of 970 females for every 1000 males, and a literacy rate of 79.56%. After Kalimpong district was separated its population was 1,595,181. Scheduled Castes and Scheduled Tribes made up 18.86% and 20.21% of the population respectively.

In 2001, the population of the district was 1,609,172. The rural population was 1,088,740 and urban population was 520,432. Total males were 830,644 and females were 778,528. The density of population was 511 per km2. The decennial population growth rate (1991–2001) was 23.79%.

The hills have a population of 624,061 which is nearly 40% of the population. The original inhabitants of the Darjeeling Hills were the Lepchas or Rongpa (the ravine people, as they prefer themselves to be known as). Other communities with a long history in the district include the Limbu, Rai, Tamang, Gurung, Magar, Newar, Thami, Chettri, Bahun, Kami, and Damai. There is also a sizeable population of Tibetans who arrived from Tibet since the 1950s. Over time, the ethnic distinctions between the hill people have blurred and today most identify as Gorkha and speak Nepali only as mother tongue.

In the plains, the Bengalis are in majority while there are large numbers of Gorkhas and Adivasis, the latter of which migrated from Chotanagpur and Santhal Parganas during British rule as tea garden workers. Both in the hills and plains are various migrants from other regions including Biharis, Marwaris and Punjabis.

Languages

At the time of the 2011 census, 39.88% of the population spoke Nepali, 26.51% Bengali, 10.95% Hindi, 6.17% Rajbongshi, 5.38% Sadri, 2.52% Kurukh, 1.50% Bhojpuri  and 1.15% Santali as their first language. According to 1951 Census, about 26% of the population in the three hill sub-divisions of Darjeeling district (including Kalimpong) spoke Nepali as mother language. Other languages formerly spoken in the hills included Rai, Limbu, Tamang, Magar, Gurung, and Newar.

Bengali is the official language of the district population with Nepali declared as co-official only in Darjeeling and Kurseong subdivisions. 

Nepali is the dominant language in the hill divisions, spoken by more than 90% of the people in Darjeeling, Kurseong and Mirik subdivisions, although most hill inhabitants are not from Khas communities. Several hundred of the original hill inhabitants still speak their original languages although the vast majority now speak only Nepali.

The main language of the Siliguri subdivision is Bengali. It is followed by a sizable number of Kamatpuri or Rajbongshi speakers. Among the Adivasis, Sadri is the main language although some still speak their original languages like Kurukh, Mundari and Santali.

Religion

Hinduism is the majority religion in both the hills and plains. Buddhism and Kirat Mudhum are almost entirely present in the hills. Christianity is primarily in the hills, although there are significant numbers among the tea tribes in the plains. Islam is almost entirely found in the plains

Flora and fauna
Darjeeling district is home to Singalila National Park, which was set up in 1986 as a wildlife sanctuary and converted to a national park in 1992.

Darjeeling district has three wildlife sanctuaries: Jorepokhri, Mahananda, and Senchal.

See also
 Gorkhaland
 Gorkha Janmukti Morcha
 Gorkha National Liberation Front
 The Darjeeling Limited

References

External links

 Darjeeling District official website

 
1835 establishments in India
Districts of West Bengal